Liar is a British thriller television series created by Harry and Jack Williams, and co-produced by ITV and SundanceTV. The series stars Joanne Froggatt and Ioan Gruffudd as two people whose initial attraction leads to far-reaching consequences for them and their friends and families. The series premiered on ITV on 11 September 2017, with the first series concluding on 16 October 2017. Upon its debut, it received positive reviews, with many critics praising the performances of Froggatt and Gruffudd. The programme was renewed for a second and final series, which premiered on 2 March 2020, concluding on 6 April 2020.

Plot
Laura Nielson, a smart and capable teacher in the middle of a breakup, is set up on a date with widowed surgeon Andrew Earlham. However, the morning after, Neilson realises she has been raped. When reporting the rape to the police proves fruitless, Nielson investigates the incident herself, ultimately discovering video evidence of her own and several other rapes. Before Earlham can be arrested, however, he is found dead, and the second series focuses on the hunt for his killer.

Cast and characters

Main
 Joanne Froggatt as Laura Nielson, a smart and dedicated teacher who is newly single
 Ioan Gruffudd as Andrew Earlham, a renowned surgeon whose son, Luke, is a pupil in Laura's class
 Zoë Tapper as Katy Sutcliffe, Laura's older sister, a doctor who works with Andrew at the local hospital
 Richie Campbell as Liam Sutcliffe, Katy's unsuspecting husband and father of her two children
 Jamie Flatters as Luke Earlham, Andrew's son who is a pupil in Laura's class
 Shelley Conn as DI Vanessa Harmon, a detective with the fictional Thanet and Dover Police who investigates Laura's allegation of rape
 Danny Webb as DS Rory Maxwell, a Thanet & Dover Police detective and second in command to Vanessa Harmon
 Kieran Bew as Ian Davis, Laura's new love interest

Recurring
 Warren Brown as PC Tom Bailey (Series 1), Laura's ex-boyfriend who is having an affair with her sister, Katy
 Eileen Davies as Andrew Earlham's elderly friend Sylvia (Series 1)
Jill Halfpenny as Jennifer Robertson, Vanessa's wife, a soldier
Dawn Steele as Catherine McAulay (Series 1), an Edinburgh barmaid and friend of Andrew Earlham
 Katherine Kelly as DI Karen Renton (Series 2), an officer from the Metropolitan Police
Sam Spruell as Oliver Graham (Series 2), an old acquaintance of Andrew Earlham
Amy Nuttall as Winnie Peterson (Series 2), a nurse
Howard Charles as Carl Peterson (Series 2), Winnie's husband who owns a boatyard, an ex-soldier and Afghanistan veteran
Dermot Crowley as Henry Neilson (Series 2), the father of Laura Neilson and Katy Sutcliffe
Jack Colgrave Hirst, as Greg Maxwell (Series 2), son of DS Rory Maxwell, a National Crime Agency officer
Lucy Speed as a Counsellor (Series 2)
Michael Wildman as DI Michael McCoy (Series 2)
Jenny Galloway as the Marina Inn hotel receptionist (Series 2)

Production
Liar was announced on 15 April 2016 as the first full production from Two Brothers Pictures. On 30 September 2016, the miniseries was commissioned by American cable network SundanceTV and British commercial broadcaster ITV. Commercial broadcasters TF1 and Seven have also ordered the series. Filming for the series began in London and Kent in November 2016. The marshes were filmed in Tollesbury, Essex. The seaside hometown for main character Laura was filmed at Deal, Kent and Kingsdown. Some inner town sequences in Brockley, Nunhead, Shortlands (Episode 3), South Ealing, and Edinburgh (Episode 4).

After the first series concluded on 16 October 2017, it was announced that the programme would be returning for a second series. The second series, which premiered on 2 March 2020, focuses on a whodunnit storyline involving the cliffhanger of the first series' finale. Froggatt and Gruffudd both returned.

Episodes

Series 1 (2017)

Series 2 (2020)

Broadcast
The series premiered on ITV on 11 September 2017 at 9pm, in exactly the same slot that the Two Brothers Pictures series Rellik premiered on BBC One. It premiered on SundanceTV on 27 September 2017. The series was acquired in Australia by the Seven Network and in New Zealand by TVNZ.

Adaptations
Up to five remakes of Liar have been produced by networks in other countries, including Italy, Spain. Germany, France and Turkey. The Italian remake, Non mentire, premiered on Canale 5 on February 17, 2019. The Spanish remake, Mentiras, was first released on Atresplayer Premium on April 19, 2020, before eventually premiering on Antena 3 on January 12, 2022. The German remake, Du sollst nicht lügen, was first released on Joyn Plus+ on February 2, 2021, before debuting on pay television on Sat.1 Emotions on February 7 and premiering free-to-air on Sat.1 on February 9. The French remake, Mensonges, was first released on Salto on July 30, 2021, before premiering on TF1 on September 2, 2021. The Turkish remake, Yalanci, premiered on Show TV on September 17, 2021.

References

External links
 
 

2017 British television series debuts
2020 British television series endings
2010s British drama television series
2010s British mystery television series
2020s British drama television series
2020s British mystery television series
British thriller television series
English-language television shows
ITV television dramas
Rape in television
Television series by All3Media
Television shows shot in Kent